As early as 1973, the FBI was running a program aimed at securing information about reading habits of many library users; this program was ultimately called the "Library Awareness Program". The Library Awareness Program was designed as a counterintelligence effort that would provide information to the FBI including the names and reading habits of users of many different libraries.  The FBI was particularly interested in learning this type of information about foreign diplomats or their agents.  It is clear that librarians and the public were unaware of this program until its existence was made public in an article published September 18, 1987 in the New York Times.

The FBI claimed that one of the major reasons this program was initiated was because hostile intelligence agents had been able to find some information that could be dangerous to the security of the United States.  The area of greatest concern was the information at academic libraries that could be accessed through sophisticated databanks used for research. This point was illuminated by the report that a Soviet employee of the United Nations had been able to recruit a college student from Queens to obtain information at the library that was described as sensitive.

The Libraries in New York City that had been the subjects of the FBI visits contacted the New York Library Association about what had happened, they in turn contacted the American Library Association. This led to the opposition of the program by the NYLA, a long time New York Congressman, and the ALA
and resulted in widespread outrage within the field.  In October 1987 the ALA's Intellectual Freedom Committee released a statement that explained the threat of this program, and urged libraries not to violate their ethical obligation to protect patrons' rights by providing information to the FBI.

In 1988 congressional hearings were conducted on the subject. The purpose of these hearings may have been to find out what the FBI had been up to in regards to the Library Awareness Program, and if it was lawful. Following these hearings several FOIA requests were submitted to obtain more information on the subject. Eventually the FBI complied with one of the requests and released 37 pages of information about FBI activities related to the program. Through this release it was learned that the actual program name may have been Development of Counterintelligence Among Librarians, or DECAL.

After the congressional hearings in 1988, many institutions decided to adopt formal policies about what to do in the event that the FBI contacted the library. Most libraries have policies in case of such an event today. Librarians have tried to make it clear that they were not against helping the FBI in general, but rather that they opposed violating the rights of their patrons. Since that time many librarians have helped the FBI in a variety of projects that did not encroach on the patron's rights. The issue has gathered a renewed concern since "9-11", and the "Patriot Act". Some people believe that the Patriot Act grants the government the right to inspect patron records without due cause in much the same way as the Library Awareness Program.

Today, many library patrons complain about the difference between passive surveillance of a patron's information and the FBI's active role in censoring online information and the free access to information.

Selected bibliography
 Foerstel, Herbert N. Surveillance in the Stacks: The FBI's Library Awareness Program. New York: Greenwood Press, 1991. 
 McFadden, Robert D. FBI in New York Asks Librarians' Aid In Reporting on Spies. New York Times,  September 18, 1987, sec. A, p. 1.

References

Federal Bureau of Investigation operations
Surveillance
American librarianship and human rights